Niculești is a commune in Dâmbovița County, Muntenia, Romania with a population of 4,463 people. It is composed of three villages: Ciocănari, Movila and Niculești.

References

Communes in Dâmbovița County
Localities in Muntenia